Nina Fout (born June 23, 1959, in Washington, D.C.) is an American equestrian. She won a bronze medal in team  eventing at the 2000 Summer Olympics in Sydney, together with Karen O'Connor, David O'Connor and Linden Wiesman.

References

External links

1959 births
Living people
American female equestrians
Olympic bronze medalists for the United States in equestrian
Equestrians at the 2000 Summer Olympics
Medalists at the 2000 Summer Olympics
Foxcroft School alumni
21st-century American women